Leonard is an unincorporated community in Greenbrier County, West Virginia, United States.

The community was named after Leonard Mitchell, an early settler.

References

Unincorporated communities in Greenbrier County, West Virginia
Unincorporated communities in West Virginia